Hakea hastata is a shrub in the family Proteaceae and is  endemic to southern Western Australia. It is an open, upright shrub with light green leaves, branches covered in dense hairs and white flowers in spring.

Description
It is sparingly branched with branchlets that are densely covered in pale brown hairs. It blooms from September to October and produces white flowers. The solitary inflorescences contain  18 to 22 flowers with a cream-white coloured perianth. The blackish brown seeds have an obliquely ovate or elliptic shape with a wing down one side.

Taxonomy and naming
Hakea hastata was first formally described by the botanist Laurence Haegi in 1999 in the appendix to the Flora of Australia from specimens collected in 1871 by Hansjörg Eichler in the Tuttanning Nature Reserve.
The specific epithet is from the Latin word hastata meaning spear-like referring to the spear-head shape of the leaves.

Distribution
This hakea is endemic an area in the Wheatbelt and Great Southern regions of Western Australia from around Pingelly in the north to Albany in the south and has a scattered distribution. The shrub is found on and around hills and grows in sandy, loamy or clay soils that can contain gravel. It is usually part of a heath understorey community in Eucalyptus woodlands.

References

hastata
Eudicots of Western Australia
Plants described in 1999